Levon Panos Dabağyan (Armenian: Լևոն Փանոս Դաբաղյան; 11 November 1933; Aksaray, Fatih, İstanbul, Turkey – 7 May 2017, Istanbul) was a Turkish writer and researcher of Armenian descent.

A member of Turkish Historical Society, he claimed that there was no genocide of Armenians.

He was the candidate in Istanbul for the far-right Nationalist Movement Party (MHP) in the 1969 Turkish parliamentary elections.

Life 
Levon Panos Dabagyan was born in Yenikapı on November 11, 1933, to an Armenian family, the child of Kirkor Karaciyan and Siranuş Dabagyan. His father's side is based on the Karaciyans who immigrated from Van to Kastamonu and from there to Istanbul, and his mother's side is the Dabagyans who immigrated from Erzurum-Van region to Istanbul. The Dabagian family belongs to the Armenian Apostolic Church.

He married his wife Eliz in 1959 and they had a daughter named Alis in 1960.

He served as an administrator in the MHP for a while and became a candidate from Istanbul in 1969. He says that he had an influence on the MHP's choice of three crescent figures as an emblem.

Works 

 Pearl-harbor'dan Hiroşima'ya (From Hiroshima to Pearl-harbor) (2004)
 Sinema Dünyası: Zaman Tünelinde Tüm Yönleriyle (World of Cinema: All Aspects Through Time) (2004)
 Türkiye Ermenileri Tarihi (History of Turkey's Armenians) (2004)
 Fatih ve Fetih Olayı (Conqueror and Conquest) (2005)
 Paylaşılamayan Belde Konstantiniyye (Konstantiniyye the Unshareable City) (2005)
 Osmanlı'da Şer Hareketleri (Vicious Movements in Ottoman Empire) (2005)
 100 Makale 100 Yorum (100 Article 100 Commentary) (2006)
 Zaman Tünelinde Şehr-i İstanbul'un Seyir Defteri (The Logbook of the City of Istanbul in Time) (2006)
 Türk Cihan Hakimiyetine Açılan Yol (The Road to Turkish World Domination) (2006)
 Ermeni Tehciri: Emperyalistler Kıskacında (Armenian Deportation: In the Grip of Imperialists) (2007)
 Başbuğ Türkeş ve Miliyetçilik (Basbug Turkes and Nationalism) (2009)
 Tarihin Işığında Ermeni Meselesi ve 1915 Kaosu (The Armenian Question in the Light of History and the Chaos of 1915) (2010)
 Geçmişten Günümüze Millet-i Sâdıka-1: Osmanlı Ermenileri (Millet-i Sâdika-1 from Past to Present: Ottoman Armenians) (2011)
 Geçmişten Günümüze Millet-i Sâdıka-2: Sanat Dünyamızda Ermeniler (Millet-i Sâdika-2 from Past to Present: Armenians in Our World of Art) (2012) 
 Geçmişten Günümüze Millet-i Sâdıka-3: İstanbul'da Gündelik Hayat (Millet-i Sâdika-3 from Past to Present: Regular Day in Istanbul) (2013)
 Bilinmeyen Sultan II. Abdülhamid Han-1 (Obscure Sultan II. Abdulhamid Han-1) (2014)

References

1933 births
2017 deaths
Deniers of the Armenian genocide
Writers from Istanbul
20th-century Turkish historians
Nationalist Movement Party politicians
People from Fatih
Ethnic Armenian historians
Turkish people of Armenian descent
21st-century Turkish historians